Pine Grove is an unincorporated community in Marion County, West Virginia, United States. Pine Groves lies to the west of Barrackville along Buffalo Creek.

References

Unincorporated communities in Marion County, West Virginia
Unincorporated communities in West Virginia